George Thomson is an Australian amateur rose breeder, known for creating disease-resistant roses tailored to the Australian climate.

Thomson was born in Scotland and trained with Alex Cocker of  Cockers Roses in Aberdeen, also completing an apprenticeship at Kew Gardens.

In 1958, Thomson emigrated to South Australia, settling in Willunga, near Adelaide.  He is considered to be one of Australia’s most productive rose breeders, planting over 350,000 seeds each year. He works closely with long established rose nursery Ross Roses, contributing new roses to its ‘True Blue’ collection, which is bred specifically for the Australian climate.

Notable roses
George Thomson roses include:
Society Belle (2008)
Crown Princess Mary (2006), named after Mary, Crown Princess of Denmark
Lady Phella (2005), winner of a bronze medal at the National Rose Trial Garden of Australia
Wildfire 2000 (2000)
Mrs Mary Thomson (1996)
Howard Florey (1998), named after Nobel Prize-winning scientist Lord Howard Florey

References

External sources
List including Thomson roses from Australian Rose Breeders Association
Burke's Backyard information about the 'True Blue' rose collection

Living people
Rose breeders
Australian horticulturists
People from Willunga, South Australia
Scottish emigrants to Australia
Year of birth missing (living people)